Mid-level practitioners, also called non-physician practitioners or advanced practice providers, are health care providers who have a defined scope of practice.  

Because of their diverse histories, mid-level providers' training, functions, scope of practice, regulation, and integration into the formal health system vary from country to country.  They have highly variable levels of education and may have a formal credential and accreditation through the licensing bodies in their jurisdictions. In some places, but not others, they provide healthcare, particularly in rural and remote areas, to make up for physician shortages.

Definitions 
The World Health Organization includes in this category all healthcare providers with all of the following qualifications:

 trained and legally authorized to provide healthcare,
 having at least two years training at university or other institution of higher education, and
 able to diagnose and treat medical conditions, within the scope of their training and licensure, by prescribing medication and/or performing surgery.

MLPs by country

Mid-level practitioner in Canada 

In Canada there are four "allied primary health practitioners" identified under the National Occupational Classification (NOC) section 3124: physician assistant, nurse practitioner, midwife, and anesthesiologist assistant. Nurse Practitioners are permitted to provide several, but not all, of the health care services physicians provide.

Mid-level practitioner in India 
In 2019, a new mid-level health care provider role was introduced in India, known as Community Health Officer (CHO). The role was intended to support the Health and Wellness Centres in community level in India. Community Health Officer (CHO) also called Mid Level Health Provider (MLHP) and non-physician practitioner, are trained health care providers who have a defined scope of practice. In India, only Nursing and AYUSH Practitioner are eligible for this cadre. This means that they are trained and legally permitted to provide healthcare in fewer situations than physicians but more than other health professionals. In india, Community Health Officer is another name of Mid-Level Practitioner.

Recently in India, Community Health Officers at Ayushman Bharat Health and Wellness Centres are now allowed to supply certain medicines to the patients, as they have been included in Section 23 of Schedule K of Drugs and Cosmetics Rules, 1945. In India, Community Health Officer (CHO) is the another name of mid-level practitioner.

Ministry of Health and family welfare, Government of India published guidelines for prevention and controlling of COVID-19 cases in rural area of India. According to guidelines Symptomatic cases can be triaged at village level by tele-consultation with Community Health Officer (CHO), and cases with comorbidity or low oxygen saturation should be sent to higher centres.

Mid-level practitioner in South Africa 
In 2008, a new mid-level practitioner role was introduced in South Africa, known as clinical associates. The role was intended to support the district hospital workforce.

Mid-level practitioner in United Kingdom 
Mid-level practitioners in the UK are known as Advanced Clinical Practitioners (ACP) or Advanced Practitioners (AP) and occurred as an evolution of many differing professions which use various titles such as ‘Extended Scope Practitioner’.  Historically there has been debate over the consistency of quality in these senior clinicians and therefore it became necessary to generate a distinguished definition of the ACP role.

The ACP:
 Is a registered healthcare practitioner with a minimum of 5 years clinical experience (2 years in a senior clinical role)
 Has acquired expert knowledge and complex decision making skills which may be an extension of their traditional scope of practice
 Will undertake a two-year level 7 (Master's degree) training course in Advanced Practice
 Will maintain training and CPD requirements 

This is an emerging role and is showing a good deal of promise in meeting the demands of the UK's rapidly evolving healthcare requirements. ACPs may practice in the acute setting (ED, critical care, etc) or community General Practice / Family Medicine. The majority can independently assess, investigate (through blood tests / imaging etc.), diagnose and formulate a treatment plan including prescribing medications or referring to specialist care.

The deployment of ACPs is considered to be part of a Value Based Recruitment framework driven by Health Education England (HEE).  This seeks to appoint clinicians based upon their competencies, values and behaviours in support of collaborative working and delivering excellent patient care.

Physician Associates 
Physician Associates (PAs) practising in the United Kingdom is the equivalent title to physician assistant, these clinicians are described as "dependent practitioners", meaning that they require supervision at all times by a physician. They cannot prescribe medications.

Mid-level practitioner in United States 
In the United States, mid-level practitioners are health care workers with training less than that of a physician but greater than that of nurses or medical assistants.

The term mid-level practitioner or mid-level provider is related to the occupational closure of healthcare. This concept centered around physicians as the ultimate professional responsible for healthcare. As healthcare demands have increased in the United States due to an aging population, a physician shortage and the implementation of the Patient Protection and Affordable Care Act of 2010 there has been a shift toward more independence in practice for professionals such as physician assistants, nurse practitioners, pharmacists, and dental therapists.

Concerns about terminology
In recent years some organizations and specialties have proposed the discontinuance of the term mid-level in reference to professional practitioners who are not physicians. Each organization prefers to use their specific title, and physicians' organizations are concerned about title inflation.

*preferred even over physician assistant, which was what the acronym historically stood for

Drug Enforcement Administration 
The term mid-level practitioner as found in the DEA classification in Section 1300.01(b28), Title 21, of the Code of Federal Regulations is used as a means of organizing drug diversion activities. The term mid-level practitioner as defined by the DEA Office of Diversion Control, "...means an individual practitioner, other than a physician, dentist, veterinarian, or podiatrist, who is licensed, registered, or otherwise permitted by the United States or the jurisdiction in which he/she practices, to dispense a controlled substance in the course of professional practice."  Some health professionals considered mid-level practitioners by the United States DEA include:

 Physician assistants
 Nurse practitioners
 Midwives
 Nurse anesthetists
 Pharmacists

 Anesthesiologist assistants
 Chiropractors
 Optometrists
 Social workers
 Psychologists

See also
Advanced practice nurse
Allied health professions
Anesthesiologist Assistant
Certified Nurse‐Midwife
Health human resources
Nurse anesthetist
Nurse practitioner
Pathologists' assistant
Physician assistant

References

External links
 Global Health Workforce Alliance: mid-level health workers

Health care occupations